I Won't Let You Go may refer to:
 "I Won't Let You Go" (Agnetha Fältskog song), 1985
 "I Won't Let You Go" (James Morrison song), 2011
 "I Won't Let You Go", a 1977 song by Jackie Trent and Tony Hatch
 "I Won't Let You Go", a 1965 song by Kathy Kirby
 "I Won't Let You Go", a 1972 song by The Three Degrees, 1972
 "I Won't Let You Go", a 1980 song by Ray Charles
 "I Won't Let You Go", a 2016 song by Switchfoot